Asyah (Al-Asyeah or Asyeah Arabic : الأسياح) is a Saudi Arabian town in Al Qassim Province. It has a total area of 200 km2.

History 
The history of the Al-asyah dates back to 1,400 years ago. In the Uthman ibn Affan era, Asyah was built to help pilgrims. It is famous for its many wells.

Location 
Asyah is located in the Al-Qassim region of central Saudi Arabia. It is almost 330 km north of Riyadh. It is bordered by the Ha'il Region to the north.

Education 
The province has more than 30 schools for boys, with more than 6,000 total students.

Villages 
There are more than thirteen hamlets. The most famous are Ain ibn Fahid, Koseba, AL-Tanumah, and Aba Elworood.

Sport 
The main football team, Mared, was established in 1979.

References

Al-Qassim Province